Jacqueline Ray is a former American actress and model, who became known for her performance in the movies In Like Flint and Beyond the Universe, and in the television show Magnum, P.I..

Career 
Ray booked her first role in the movie In Like Flint. She starred in two further movies The Killings at Outpost Zeta (1980) and Beyond The Universe (1981), and also appeared in the American drama series Magnum, P.I.. In 2006 she earned a role in the teen TV show Unfabulous and its spin-off Unfabulous: The Best Trip Ever.

Personal life 
Ray married three times. She was married to film producer and actor Tom Selleck on May 15, 1971, becoming Hollywood's power couple. However, after 11 years, she filed for divorce because Tom Selleck moved to Hawaii in order to film a movie. As she later played alongside Selleck in Magnum, P.I., in March 1992, she married for the third time, to Clarence Barry Witmer.

Filmography

Television

Film

External links

References

1945 births
Living people
People from Burbank, California
American film actresses